Queshuachaca (also spelled Keshwa Chaca, Q'iswa Chaca, Keswachaka, Q'eshwachaka, Qeswachaka, Q'eswachaca, Q'eswachaka, Queshuachaca, or Queswachaka), is the last remaining Inca rope bridge, consisting of grass ropes that span the Apurimac River near Huinchiri, in Quehue District, Canas Province, Peru.  

Even though there is a modern bridge nearby, the residents of the region keep the ancient tradition and skills alive by renewing the bridge annually, in June. Several family groups have each prepared a number of grass-ropes to be formed into cables at the site, others prepare mats for decking, and the reconstruction is a communal effort. In ancient times the effort would have been a form of tax, with participants coerced to perform the rebuilding; nowadays the builders have indicated that effort is performed to honor their ancestors and the Pachamama (Earth Mother).

The event has also been supported by video productions for Nova and the BBC and is the subject of an independent documentary titled The Last Bridge Master (in-production, 2014). It is becoming a minor tourist attraction, with some small tolls charged for tourists to use the road during the festival to walk the newly completed bridge. In 2009 the government recognized the bridge and its maintenance as part of the cultural heritage of Peru, and there is now some outside sponsorship.
The lead bridge engineer was Victoriano Arizapana.

Due to a lack of maintenance during the COVID-19 pandemic in 2020 and early 2021, the bridge collapsed in March 2021. In the following weeks the bridge was rebuilt.

Renewing the bridge

References

External links 
 The Bridge at Q’eswachaka - YouTube (duration—3:15; produced by the Smithsonian Institution)

Annual events in Peru
Bridges in Peru
Buildings and structures in Cusco Region
Inca
June events
Peruvian culture
Recycling in Peru
Cultural heritage of Peru